Zdeněk Volek (born 12 April 1985) is a Czech football player who currently plays for Austrian club SC Amaliendorf-Aalfang. 

He played at youth level for the Czech Republic.

References

External links
 

1985 births
Living people
Czech footballers
FK Chmel Blšany players
FK Dukla Prague players
FK Ústí nad Labem players
FK Teplice players
FK Viktoria Žižkov players
Czech First League players
Czech National Football League players
Association football midfielders